Aorist (abbreviated ) verb forms usually express perfective aspect and refer to past events, similar to a preterite. Ancient Greek grammar had the aorist form, and the grammars of other Indo-European languages and languages influenced by the Indo-European grammatical tradition, such as Middle Persian, Sanskrit, Armenian, the South Slavic languages, Georgian, and Pashto also have forms referred to as aorist.

The word comes from Ancient Greek   "indefinite", as the aorist was the unmarked (default) form of the verb, and thus did not have the implications of the imperfective aspect, which referred to an ongoing or repeated situation, or the perfect, which referred to a situation with a continuing relevance; instead it described an action "pure and simple".

Because the aorist was the unmarked aspect in Ancient Greek, the term is sometimes applied to unmarked verb forms in other languages, such as the habitual aspect in Turkish.

Indo-European languages

Proto-Indo-European
In Proto-Indo-European, the aorist appears to have originated as a series of verb forms expressing manner of action. Proto-Indo-European had a three-way aspectual opposition, traditionally called "present", "aorist", and "perfect", which are thought to have been, respectively, imperfective, perfective, and stative (resultant state) aspects. By the time of Classical Greek, this system was maintained largely in independent instances of the non-indicative moods and in the nonfinite forms.  But in the indicative, and in dependent clauses with the subjunctive and optative, the aspects took on temporal significance.  In this manner, the aorist was often used as an unmarked past tense, and the perfect came to develop a resultative use, which is why the term perfect is used for this meaning in modern languages. 

Other Indo-European languages lost the aorist entirely. In the development of Latin, for example, the aorist merged with the perfect. The preterites (past perfectives) of the Romance languages, which are sometimes called 'aorist', are an independent development.

Greek

In Ancient Greek, the  indicative  aorist is one of the two main forms used in telling a story; it is used for undivided events, such as the individual steps in a continuous process (narrative aorist); it is also used for events that took place before the story itself (past-within-past). The  aorist indicative is also used to express things that happen in general, without asserting a time (the "gnomic aorist").  It can also be used of present and future events; the aorist also has several specialized senses meaning present action.

Non-indicative forms of the aorist (subjunctives, optatives, imperatives, infinitives) are usually purely aspectual, with certain exceptions including indirect speech constructions and the use of optative as part of the sequence of tenses in dependent clauses.  There are aorist infinitives and imperatives that do not imply temporality at all.  For example, the Lord's Prayer in Matthew 6:11 uses the aorist imperative in "Give us this day our daily bread", in contrast to the analogous passage in Luke 11:3, which uses the imperfective aspect, implying repetition, with "Give (present imperative) us day by day our daily bread."

An example of how the aorist tense contrasts with the imperfect in describing the past occurs in Xenophon's Anabasis, when the Persian aristocrat Orontas is executed: "and those who had been previously in the habit of bowing (imperfect) to him, bowed (aorist) to him even then."  Here the imperfect refers to a past habitual or repeated act, and the aorist to a single one.

There is disagreement as to which functions of the Greek aorist are inherent within it. Some of the disagreement applies to the history of the development of the various functions and forms. Most grammarians differentiate the aorist indicative from the non-indicative aorists. Many authors hold that the aorist tends to be about the past because it is perfective, and perfectives tend to describe completed actions; others that the aorist indicative and to some extent the participle is essentially a mixture of past tense and perfective aspect.

Hermeneutic implications 
Because the aorist was not maintained in either Latin or the Germanic languages, there have long been difficulties in translating the Greek New Testament into Western languages. The aorist has often been interpreted as making a strong statement about the aspect or even the time of an event, when, in fact, due to its being the unmarked (default) form of the Greek verb, such implications are often left to context. Thus, within New Testament hermeneutics, it is considered an exegetical fallacy to attach undue significance to uses of the aorist. Although one may draw specific implications from an author's use of the imperfective or perfect, no such conclusions can, in general, be drawn from the use of the aorist, which may refer to an action "without specifying whether the action is unique, repeated, ingressive, instantaneous, past, or accomplished." In particular, the aorist does not imply a "once for all" action, as it has commonly been misinterpreted, although it frequently refers to a simple, non-repeated action.

Sanskrit

Although quite common in older Sanskrit, the aorist is comparatively infrequent in much of classical Sanskrit, occurring, for example, 66 times in the first book of the Rāmāyaṇa, 8 times in the Hitopadeśa, 6 times in the Bhagavad-Gītā, and 6 times in the story of Śakuntalā in the Mahābhārata.

In the later language, the aorist indicative had the value of a preterite, while in the older language it was closer in sense to the perfect. The aorist was also used with the ancient injunctive mood, particularly in prohibitions.

Slavic languages

The Indo-European aorist was inherited by the Slavic languages but has survived intact only in the South Slavic languages. It retains its function entirely in the Eastern South Slavic languages, Bulgarian and Macedonian. However, in Western South Slavic languages it has become, along with the imperfect and pluperfect, largely obsolete in daily parlance and mostly superseded by the perfect and circumlocution. The aorist is part of the standardized varieties of Serbo-Croatian but is no longer part of Standard Slovene. In both languages, the aorist appears mostly in older literature, scripture, religious services and legislation and so carries an archaic tone. As such, its use can be construed as pretentious and bombastic. Its use does not cause ambiguity, as Slavic verbs have distinct grammatical aspects to convey related, yet distinct, meanings.

The prevalence of the aorist varied by region prior to the grammatical changes during the  communists' rise to power in SFR Yugoslavia after World War II. Historically, in Croatia and Croatian dialects, the aorist was naturally displaced by the perfect in most dialects (Chakavian, Kajkavian and Shtokavian) In Serbia and Serbian dialects, the aorist was historically commonly used to describe the past. In 1933, the Serbian linguist Aleksandar Belić was tasked by the authorities of the Kingdom of Yugoslavia with creating a formal grammar for the new Serbo-Croatian standard. He decided to curb the use of the aorist by noting that there were many speakers of the language "in Yugoslavia who rarely use aorist, or do not use it at all". In an effort to reinforce the use of the unified and standardized language in public and education, the usage of the aorist gradually became prescriptively stigmatized and eventually excluded from official use in PR Serbia. Even so, it is still widespread in rural areas of Serbia, especially among the older and less educated part of the population. In standardized forms, the aorist is used for witnessed actions from a specific time in the past, mostly with verbs of perfective aspect.

In modern forms of communication, the aorist has experienced something of a revival among younger speakers in Serbia, as its forms are simpler and shorter to type out than the perfect.

In Bulgarian, which has produced a new regular formation, the aorist is used in indirect and in presumptive quotations. Bulgarian has separate inflections for aorist (past imperfective) and general perfective. The aorist may be used with the imperfective to produce a compound perfective–imperfective aspect.

The aorist in Macedonian is called the "past definite complete tense" and refers to a completed action in the past tense. It most often corresponds to the simple past tense in English: I read the book, I wrote the letter, I ate my supper, etc. In contemporary standard Macedonian, the aorist is formed almost exclusively from perfective verbs. The formation of the aorist for most verbs is not complex, but there are numerous small subcategories that must be learned. All verbs in the aorist (except ) take the same endings, but there are complexities in the aorist stem vowel and possible consonant alternations. All verbs (except ) take the following endings in the aorist:

 

(The sign ∅ indicates a zero ending: nothing is added after the stem vowel.)

In East and West Slavic languages the aorist is obsolete everywhere except for the copula 'to be' which is still used to mark the Conditional mood.

In the East Slavic Languages it is not inflected for number or person. It's 'бы' in Russian and Belarusian, and 'би' in Ukrainian, but is commonly shortened to 'б' in all of those. The Conditional mood is formed by putting it after the main verb

In the West Slavic Languages it is inflected and works similar to East Slavic Languages except that it can be put before the main verb. These are the inflections in Polish and Czech respectively:

Morphology
In the Indo-European languages Greek and Sanskrit, the aorist stem is marked by several morphological devices (the aorist indicative also has the past-tense augment  e-, which contracts with the initial vowel). Three aorist morphological devices stand out as most common:

South Caucasian languages
In Georgian and Svan, the aorist marks perfective aspect.  In the indicative, it marks completed events. In other moods, it marks events that are yet to be completed.

In Mingrelian and Laz, the aorist is basically a past tense and can be combined with both perfective and imperfective aspects as well as the imperative and the subjunctive moods.

Northeast Caucasian languages
In Khinalug, the aorist is a perfective aspect, and the two terms ("aorist" and "perfective") are often used interchangeably.

In Udi, the aorist is an imperfective aspect that is usually a past tense but can also replace the present tense.

Turkish
In Turkish, the aorist (literally "broad time") is a habitual aspect and is similar to the English present simple. For example, the statement  ("I do not eat meat") informs the listener that the speaker is a vegetarian and not merely that he happens not to be eating meat at that very moment. To convey the latter message, the present progressive  ("I' am not eating meat") would be appropriate. That makes a question like  ambiguous, as the listener may interpret it as an informational question ("Are you someone who eats pork"?) or as an offer ("Would you [like to] eat pork?").

Constructed languages
In J. R. R. Tolkien's constructed language Quenya, the aorist is a gnomic tense or simple present that expresses general facts or simple present actions.

See also
 
 Preterite

References

External links

 Greek tenses

Grammatical aspects
Grammatical tenses